A disdrometer is an instrument used to measure the drop size distribution and velocity of falling hydrometeors. Some disdrometers can distinguish between rain, graupel, and hail.

The uses for disdrometers are numerous. They can be used for traffic control, scientific examination, airport observation systems, and hydrology. The latest disdrometers employ microwave or laser technologies. 2D video disdrometers can be used to analyze individual raindrops and snowflakes.

See also
 Rain gauge
 Snow gauge

References

Measuring instruments
Meteorological instrumentation and equipment
Hydrology instrumentation